Yul Narcizo Arzú Casildo (born 21 October 1986 in San Pedro Sula, Honduras) is a Honduran footballer who play as goalkeeper for Liga Nacional de Fútbol de Honduras club Vida.

Career
Arzú started his career at Real España and also played for Deportes Savio and Vida before joining Second Division Choloma in summer 2010.

Atlético Choloma
On the mid of 2010, Arzú moved to Atlético Choloma and made his debut in the Liga Nacional de Ascenso de Honduras 2010 Apertura, where he did a great performance as a goalkeeper. On 5 June 2011, Atlético Choloma beat Real Sociedad in  penalty shoot-out, Arzú scored in the penalty shoot-out in the 2010–11 Clausura Final and Atlético Choloma emerged victorious 4–5 on penalties. On 18 June 2011, Atlético Choloma beat Parrillas One 1-0 in the 2nd leg of the 2010–11 Promotion, ascending for the first time to Liga Nacional de Honduras.

On 7 August 2011, Arzú made his domestic league debut against Olimpia in a 2-0 defeat.

In summer 2012, Arzú returned to Vida.

References

1986 births
Living people
People from San Pedro Sula
Association football goalkeepers
Honduran footballers
Real C.D. España players
Deportes Savio players
C.D.S. Vida players
Juticalpa F.C. players
Atlético Choloma players
Liga Nacional de Fútbol Profesional de Honduras players
2014 Copa Centroamericana players